Microbacterium pseudoresistens is a Gram-positive and rod-shaped bacterium from the genus Microbacterium which has been isolated from the fungus Agaricus blazei in Taiwan.

References

Further reading

External links
Type strain of Microbacterium pseudoresistens at BacDive -  the Bacterial Diversity Metadatabase

Bacteria described in 2010
pseudoresistens